Federal Route 202, or Jalan Air Canal-Lakota, is a federal road in Kelantan, Malaysia.

Features

At most sections, the Federal Route 202 was built under the JKR R5 road standard, allowing maximum speed limit of up to 90 km/h.

List of junctions and towns

References

Malaysian Federal Roads